{{safesubst:#invoke:RfD||2=Specific redirects to Multivitamin|month = March
|day = 13
|year = 2023
|time = 17:11
|timestamp = 20230313171124

|content=
REDIRECT Multivitamin

}}